Stefan Edwall (born 1971) is an ITHF table hockey player. He was world champion in 1999, Nordic Champion in 2002, and won at the Oslo Open in 2006.

References

Table hockey players
1971 births
Living people
Place of birth missing (living people)
Date of birth missing (living people)
21st-century Swedish people